The Heterogynidae are a family of insects in the order Lepidoptera. Only two genera are currently recognized: Heterogynis and Janseola.

References

Natural History Museum Lepidoptera genus database

 
Moth families